The 26th Pennsylvania House of Representatives District is in southeastern Pennsylvania and has been represented by Paul Friel since 2023.

District profile 
The 26th Pennsylvania House of Representatives District is located in Chester County and includes the following areas:

 East Coventry Township
 East Nantmeal Township
East Pikeland Township
 East Vincent Township
 Elverson
 North Coventry Township
Phoenixville
 South Coventry Township
Spring City
 Warwick Township
 West Nantmeal Township

Representatives

Recent election results

References

External links 
 District map from the United States Census Bureau
 Pennsylvania House Legislative District Maps from the Pennsylvania Redistricting Commission.
 Population Data for District 26 from the Pennsylvania Redistricting Commission.

Government of Chester County, Pennsylvania
Government of Montgomery County, Pennsylvania
26